Bwiti is a spiritual discipline of the forest-dwelling Punu people and Mitsogo peoples of Gabon (where it is recognized as one of three official religions) and by the Fang people of Gabon and Cameroon. Modern Bwiti incorporates animism, ancestor worship, and in some cases, Christianity, into a syncretistic belief system.

Bwiti practitioners use the psychedelic, dissociative root bark of the Tabernanthe iboga plant, specially cultivated for the religion, to promote radical spiritual growth, to stabilize community and family structure, to meet religious requirements, and to resolve pathological problems. The root bark has been consumed for hundreds of years in a Bwiti rite of passage ceremony, as well as in initiation rites and acts of healing. The experience yields complex visions and insights anticipated to be valuable to the initiate and the chapel.

Liturgy

Intoxicants in liturgy
Taking Iboga brings both open and closed-eye visions which can be made stronger by darkness, ambiance, and suggestion. Following the visions, users experience an introspective mindset in which they often recount past experiences in life. Difficulty sleeping, nausea, and vomiting sometimes last until the day after consumption.

Rites
Bwiti ceremonies are led by a spiritual leader called N'ganga who is a very important member of the community and has extensive knowledge of traditional healing practices, hexes, and spells. The crucial rite of Bwiti is the initiation ceremony, when young Gabonese women and men take iboga for the first time in the huts specific to each gender to become members of the spiritual practice. There are many ceremonies at different times of the year to give homage to the ancestors. Special ceremonies may be held to heal sick persons or drive out malevolent spirits.

During some ceremonies, a traditional torch made of bark and tree sap, the mupeto, is burned. Music and dance are central to the Bwiti tradition. Participants sing and play drums and shakers. Some traditions use the Ngombi harp, while other use the traditional Mongongo. The N'ganga and other participants usually dress in red, black, and white cloth. They may wear skirts of raffia material and small shells or beads. Animal skins, such as Genet fur, are often worn. The iboga root may be made into a tea or more often taken in the form of scrapings. Ceremonies usually begin at night and may last for days since the effects of doses of the drug of the size employed in such ceremonies are particularly long lasting.

Sects and Rites
The term "Bwiti" is often misrepresented in the west. This is likely due to a lack of information dissemination (considering it is an oral tradition), appropriation and modification of rites amongst the different populations, and purposeful disinformation to keep rites secret. The Pygmy peoples are often cited as the origin of Bwiti, or at least of the use of Iboga in a ritualistic context.

Recognition
Bwiti is one of Gabon's official traditions. Some sects are influenced by Christianity, and include the use of the Christian calendar.

Notes

References

 Holy War- A Tale of Bwiti Initiation, Part 1 (2018) by Jim Dziura. Psychedelic Times
 Holy War- A Tale of Bwiti Initiation, Part 2 (2018) by Jim Dziura. Psychedelic Times
BBC TV Series (2005). Tribe (link) - explorer Bruce Parry spent a month living amongst the Babongo and was initiated into their use of Iboga.
Tribe Babongo Iboga With Bruce Parry; Divx Video Quality.
Pinchbeck, Daniel (2002). "Breaking Open the Head". Broadway Books. Part I pages 9–39.
Pinchbeck, Daniel (1999). "Tripping on Iboga". Salon Travel
Samorini, Giorgio. "Adam, Eve and Iboga" (Originally published in Integration 4: 4-10).
Samorini, Giorgio. "The Bwiti Religion and the psychoactive plant Tabernanthe iboga (Equatorial Africa)" (Originally published in Integration 5: 105-114)

Further reading
 
 
 Bwiti: An Ethnography of the Religious Imagination in Africa. By James W. Fernandez, Princeton University Press, 1982.

African shamanism
Animism in Africa
Iboga
Religion in Cameroon
Religion in Gabon
Religious organizations using entheogens